The Church of the Mediator is an historic church in Micanopy, Florida which was built in 1874 as a Presbyterian church but since 1966 has been an Episcopal church. It is a contributing property in the Micanopy Historic District.

History
The church was built in 1874 to serve a Presbyterian congregation that dated back to 1854. Presbyterian services continued in the church until the 1960s. In 1966, the property was acquired for an Episcopal mission which started services in the building on October 16, 1966. The name Church of the Mediator was chosen for the new mission to remember the Episcopal church of that name that existed in Micanopy from 1857 to the 1910s, and whose building at another location in Micanopy was torn down in the 1920s.

Current use
The Church of the Mediator is still active in the Episcopal Diocese of Florida. Its current vicar is the Rev. George Holston.

See also

Micanopy Historic District

References

External links
Episcopal Church of the Mediator website
Black-and-white photo of church
Travel Micanopy includes a color photo and a visit to the church
Walking tour of Micanopy. Church is 6 on list and is labeled Presbyterian Church

Churches in Alachua County, Florida
Mediator
Churches on the National Register of Historic Places in Florida
Churches completed in 1874
19th-century Episcopal church buildings
Historic district contributing properties in Florida
National Register of Historic Places in Alachua County, Florida
1874 establishments in Florida